Achlya jezoensis is a moth in the family Drepanidae. It was described by Shōnen Matsumura in 1927. It is found in Japan, China (Heilongjiang, Inner Mongolia), south-eastern Russia and the Korean Peninsula.

References

Moths described in 1927
Thyatirinae
Moths of Asia